The national football association of Morocco was scheduled to bid to host the 2030 FIFA World Cup. The bid will be led by the Royal Moroccan Football Federation, who officially confirmed it on 15 June 2018. 

On 25 July 2018, Royal Moroccan Football Federation president Fouzi Lekjaa confirmed Morocco will apply for the 2030 World Cup bid.

On 14 March 2023, Morocco abandoned the bid and joined the Spain–Portugal bid.

Background 
The 2030 bid is Morocco's would've been sixth bid to host the FIFA World Cup after a record five unsuccessful attempts in 1994, 1998, 2006, 2010 and 2026. If successful, it will be the second African country, after the 2010 tournament in South Africa, as well as a Muslim majority country after the 2022 tournament in Qatar, to host the tournament. It will also be the first FIFA World Cup held in North Africa. The Iberian bid with Morocco will now be Morocco's 6th bid the to host the FIFA World Cup.

Joint bid
Morocco were possibly planning to co-bid with two CAF members Tunisia and Algeria. Tunisia would have to provide four 40,000+ seat stadiums, of which it has one, another waiting for a major rebuild, one in construction and one in the planning stage. Algeria would have to provide 10 stadiums, of which three would be renovated and the others built later. This could make decisions to make the list of Moroccan stadiums very tight if there were 16 stadiums with 5 matches instead of 20 with 4 matches per stadium. Another possible joint bid would be with Spain and Portugal, given their close geography Morocco has been interested in co-bidding with the Spain-Portugal-Ukraine 2030 FIFA World Cup Bid, and Morocco has renewed interest after their successful 2022 World Cup run. Morocco officially joined the Iberian Bid after Ukraine withdrew in 2023.

See also
Uruguay–Argentina–Chile–Paraguay 2030 FIFA World Cup bid
Egypt–Greece–Saudi Arabia 2030 FIFA World Cup bid
Spain–Portugal–Morocco 2030 FIFA World Cup bid
Morocco 2026 FIFA World Cup bid

References

2030 FIFA World Cup bids
Bid